Trosper may refer to:

 Trosper, Kentucky
 Trosper Lake, a lake in Washington

People with the surname
 Guy Trosper (1911–1963), American screenwriter
 James Trosper, Native American tribal rights advocate
 Justin Trosper (born 1972), American musician
 Terrie Trosper (1969–1991)